Sanj Dan (also Romanized as Sanj Dān and Sanjdān) is a village in Kakavand-e Sharqi Rural District, Kakavand District, Delfan County, Lorestan Province, Iran. At the 2006 census, its population was 72, in 13 families.

References 

Towns and villages in Delfan County